The Canadian Astronaut Corps is a unit of the Canadian Space Agency (CSA)  that selects, trains, and provides astronauts as crew members for U.S. and Russian space missions. The corps has four active members, able to serve on the International Space Station (ISS).

History
The original 6 astronauts selected in 1983 were under the auspices of the National Research Council of Canada. They were transferred to the Canadian Space Agency when it was established in 1989.

Since 1984, when Marc Garneau became the first Canadian in space, nine CSA astronauts have flown on US NASA Space Shuttles and on Russian Soyuz rockets in 15 missions.

In May 2009, Robert Thirsk flew to the International Space Station (ISS) for a six-month stay, thus becoming the first Canadian to stay aboard the ISS for an extended period. On December 1, 2009, after spending 188 days in space, Robert Thirsk returned to Earth aboard a Soyuz spacecraft. Canadian astronaut Chris Hadfield, the first Canadian Commander of the ISS, would go on to achieve worldwide fame in 2013 for releasing a music video he recorded on the International Space Station of his version of David Bowie's song "Space Oddity". Astronaut Julie Payette would go on to serve as the Governor General of Canada, and Garneau would become Minister of Foreign Affairs.

Organization
The Astronauts Corps is one of seven main divisions within the CSA. In addition to its Astronaut Corps, one of the most prominent contributions of Canada to space exploration is the robotic arm on the US space shuttles, the Canadarm.

There are four active astronauts in the Corps (Jeremy Hansen, David Saint-Jacques, Joshua Kutryk and Jennifer Sidey-Gibbons) and ten former astronauts who have gone into space. Of the 9 current and former Canadian astronauts who have gone into space, 2 are women: Julie Payette and Roberta Bondar.

Qualifications
The CSA generally recruits astronauts who have degrees as scientists, engineers and/or medical doctors. In addition to being Canadian citizens or residents, candidates must meet certain physical standards (including height, weight, hearing and visual acuity) as well as educational requirements.

Members

Active astronauts
The CSA has four active astronauts. David Saint-Jacques launched to the ISS on Soyuz MS-11 in December of 2018; the other three have yet to fly their first mission.

Former astronauts
There are ten former CSA astronauts.

Selection groups
 1983 NRC Group - Roberta Bondar, Marc Garneau, Steve MacLean, Ken Money, Robert Thirsk, and Bjarni Tryggvason (all transferred to CSA in 1989)
 1992 CSA Group - Dave Williams, Julie Payette, Chris Hadfield and Michael McKay
 2009 CSA Group - Jeremy Hansen and David Saint-Jacques
 2017 CSA Group - Joshua Kutryk and Jennifer Sidey

See also
European Astronaut Corps
JAXA Astronaut Corps
NASA Astronaut Corps
List of astronauts by selection
Human spaceflight
History of spaceflight

References

External links
Canadian Astronaut Corps History

Space program of Canada
Lists of astronauts
Astronaut